The Puji Bridge, also known as Houchuan Bridge and High Bridge, is a historic stone arch bridge over the Gaoqiao River in Zunyi, Guizhou, China.

History
The original bridge dates back to the Southern Song dynasty (1127–1279) and was built by Yang Can, a local tusi in Guizhou. It was named after Puji Temple, a neighbouring Buddhist temple. It was rebuilt in the following Yuan dynasty (1271–1368). The bridge was destroyed by a catastrophic flood in the Jiajing era (1522–1566) of the Ming dynasty (1368–1644) and was restored in the Chongzhen era (1628–1644).

In 1985, it was designated as a provincial level cultural heritage by Guizhou Provincial Government.

Architecture
The bridge was made of red sandstone.

References

Bridges in Guizhou
Arch bridges in China
Bridges completed in the 17th century
Ming dynasty architecture
Buildings and structures completed in the 17th century